Lorne Earle Coe (born October 5th 1949) is a politician in Ontario, Canada. He is a Progressive Conservative member of the Legislative Assembly of Ontario who represents the riding of Whitby and was first elected in a by-election held on 11 February 2016. Coe was elected with 52% of the vote compared to 28% for his closest rival, Elizabeth Roy of the Ontario Liberal Party.  Coe served on Whitby Town Council for 13 years, first as a town councillor and as a regional councillor from 2010 until his election to the provincial legislature in 2016.

In January 2018, after party leader Patrick Brown stepped down and was replaced by Vic Fedeli, Coe  replaced Brown as the party's education critic.

Prior to entering politics, Coe had worked in both the private sector and for several ministries in the provincial government. Since November 2018, he has served as the Government Chief Whip in the Legislative Assembly of Ontario.

Electoral record

References

External links

1950 births
Living people
People from Whitby, Ontario
Progressive Conservative Party of Ontario MPPs
Ontario municipal councillors
21st-century Canadian politicians